Beach volleyball at the 2015 Pacific Games in Port Moresby, Papua New Guinea was held on July 13–18, 2015.

Nations participating
A total of 16 countries participated in beach volleyball at the 2015 Pacific Games.
 American Samoa (4)
 Cook Islands (2)
 Fiji (4)
 Guam (4)
 Kiribati (2)
 Marshall Islands (2)
 New Caledonia (4)
 Northern Mariana Islands (4)
 Palau (2)
 Papua New Guinea (Host) (4)
 Samoa (4)
 Solomon Islands (4)
 Tahiti (4)
 Tonga (4)
 Tuvalu (4)
 Vanuatu (4)

Medal summary

Medal table

Results

See also
 Beach volleyball at the Pacific Games

References

2015 Pacific Games
Pacific Games
Beach volleyball at the Pacific Games